Our Lady of Charity (Latin: Nostræ Dominæ Charitatis) is a celebrated Marian title of the Blessed Virgin Mary venerated in many Catholic countries.

Various similar Marian images can be found in Cuba, France, Italy, Mexico, the Philippines, Spain and the United States of America.

Cuba

The history of La Vírgen de la Caridad del Cobre began around 1612. The image is thought to have been brought by Spaniard colonists from the town of Illescas, a province in Toledo, Spain where a similar statue of the Virgin Mary of Charity was already well-venerated.

Local legend recalls the Spanish captains who bring with them religious Marian images to guide and protect them from English pirates at sea. Two Native American or Indian brothers, Rodrigo and Juan de Hoyos, and an African  slave child, Juan Moreno, set out to the Bay of Nipe for salt. They are traditionally given the moniker the "three Juans".  They needed the salt for the preservation of the meat at the Barajagua slaughter house, which supplied the workers and inhabitants of Santiago del Prado, now known as El Cobre. While out in the bay, a storm arose, rocking their tiny boat violently with incoming waves. Juan, the child, was wearing a medal with the image of the Virgin Mary. The three men began to pray for her protection. Suddenly, the skies cleared, and the storm was gone. In the distance, they saw a strange object floating in the water. They rowed towards it as the waves carried it to them. At first they mistook it for a bird, but quickly saw that it was what seemed to be a statue of a girl. At last they were able to determine that it was a statue of the Virgin Mary holding the child Jesus on her left arm and a gold cross in her right hand. The statue was fastened to a board with an inscription saying "Yo Soy la Vírgen de la Caridad" or "I am the Virgin of Charity". Much to their surprise, the statue remained completely dry while afloat in the water.

Overjoyed by what they had discovered, they hurried back to Barajagua. They showed the statue to a government official, Don Francisco Sánchez de Moya, who then ordered a small chapel to be built in her honor. One night, Rodrigo went to visit the statue, but discovered that the image was gone. He organized a search party, but had no success in finding Our Lady of Charity. Then, the next morning, she was back on the altar, as if nothing had happened. This was inconceivable as the chapel had been locked. This event happened three times. The people of Barajagua came to the conclusion that she wanted to be in a different spot, so they took her to El Cobre. She was received with much joy in El Cobre, and the church there had its bells ring on her arrival. It was at this point that she became known as "Nuestra Señora de la Caridad del Cobre" or "Our Lady of Charity of El Cobre". Much to the dismay of people in El Cobre, the disappearance of the statue continued to happen.
  
One day, a young girl named Jabba was playing outside, pursuing butterflies and picking flowers. She went towards the mountains of the Sierra Maestra, where she came across the statue on top of a small hill. There were those who did and those who did not believe the little girl's testimony, but in the end, the Virgin was taken to the spot of her discovery, where a church was erected for her.

Before the famous image on 19 May 1801, a royal edict from King Charles IV of Spain decreed that Cuban slaves were to be freed from the El Cobre copper mines. The story circulated around the island quickly. Many felt  that the Virgin purposely chose to have her sanctuary in El Cobre because it is located in Oriente Province. Later folk legends associated the taking of copper materials to their homes after having it blessed near the Virgin's sanctified image as a form of souvenir and miraculous healing.

Pope Pius XI granted a canonical coronation for the image on 20 December 1936. Pope Paul VI raised the shrine to the status of Minor Basilica on 22 December 1977. The feast day of the image is commemorated on September 8; the birthday and Nativity of the  Virgin Mary.

Description of the image

 

The Cuban statue venerated measures about 16 inches tall; the head is made of baked clay covered with a polished coat of fine white powder. Her feet rest on a brilliant moon, while angels spread their golden wings on a silver cloud. The Child Jesus raises his right hand as in a blessing, and in his left hand he holds a golden globe. A popular image of Our Lady of Charity includes a banner above her head with the Latin phrase “Mater Caritatis Fluctibus Maris Ambulavit” (English: Mother of Charity who walked on the road of stormy seas). Originally, the robes on the image were white in color. Newer robes are embroidered with gold and silver, which includes the national shield of Cuba. Among Cuban religious devotees, the image is given the familiar title of La Cachita.

The statue stands on a pedestal behind glass above the altar in the El Cobre basilica. The color yellow is associated with the Virgin of Charity, and her shrines are often filled with yellow flowers.

A chapel of Our Lady of Charity exists within the Basilica of the National Shrine of the Immaculate Conception in Washington, D.C.

Pontifical approbations
Cuban revolutionary leader Carlos Manuel de Céspedes presented the Cuban banner to the image along with his soldiers who wore a similar medal while Cuban general Calixto García bowed at the image during a Holy Mass in honor of Mambises resistance. Our Lady of Charity acquired the title La Vírgen Mambisa or the Virgin for Cuban Independence.

On 24 September 1915 the Cuban revolutionaries wrote a letter petitioning the Pope Benedict XV to honor her as Patroness of their country.

 Pope Benedict XV declared Our Lady of Charity of El Cobre Patroness of Cuba via a decree signed on 10 May 1916 at the written request of the soldier veterans of the Cuban War of Independence.
 Pope Pius XI granted a canonical coronation for the image during the Eucharistic Congress at Santiago de Cuba on 20 December 1936 by Monsignor  Valentin Zubizarreta y Unamunsaga.
 Pope Paul VI, in his Papal bull Quanto Christifideles then raised her sanctuary to the category of minor basilica on 22 December 1977 through the appointed Papal legate Cardinal Bernardin Gantin.
 Pope John Paul II solemnly crowned the image again during his Apostolic Visit on 24 January 1998.
 Pope Benedict XVI awarded a Golden Rose in honor of the image and her shrine on 27 March 2012. 
 Pope Francis enshrined a brass statue given to Pope Benedict XVI by Cuban bishops (in May 2008) within the Gardens of Vatican City in August 2014, then enshrined in 2016 at the 13th slot.

Cuban national identity
The Virgin is one of the island's most treasured figures, representing hope and salvation in the face of misfortune. Over time, La Cachita "has become a quintessential symbol of Cuban identity". She unites both those at home and abroad, across lines of race and class. Wherever Cuban immigrants settled, they brought with them their devotion to la Caridad. Emilio Cueto points out the Christian themes suggested by La Cachita: "She came to Cuba bearing the greatest of gifts—her own child—and appeared not to a priest or bishop, but to common men. She spoke not just to the aboriginal people, but also to the Spaniards, Creoles, and African slaves." For Cubans who follow Yoruban religious practices, La Vírgen de la Caridad is syncretized with the orisha Ochún.

Pope John Paul II
  

On his Apostolic Visit to Cuba in 24 January 1998, Pope John Paul II declared the following:

Pope Francis
On his Apostolic Visit to Cuba in 22 September 2015, Pope Francis declared the following:

Ernest Hemingway
In 1954, American author Ernest Hemingway gifted his Nobel Prize in Literature medal for The Old Man and the Sea to Marian image at the shrine of Caridad del Cobre in Cuba. The medal was stolen in 1986, but was recovered days later upon the threat of Raúl Castro that it be returned or the thieves suffer the consequences. After its return, it was, for some time, hidden from view. The medal is very rarely present in the image and only worn during solemn and Papal occasions.

France

La Charité-sur-Loire was the home of the Abbaye de la Charité, a very large and famous Cistercian monastery. When the priory church, Notre-Dame-de-La-Charité, was built in the 11th century, it was the second largest building in Europe, only surpassed by the church at Cluny Abbey. The nave was shortened after the fire of 1559 destroyed its roof. The church has been on the list of UNESCO World Heritage Sites since 1998. It currently serves as a parish church dedicated to Notre Dame de la Nativité.

The Catholic Saint, John Eudes founded the “Order of Our Lady of Charity of the Refuge” to give reformed male and female  prostitutes housing, shelter and new work. The order survives today with many other charitable activities. Offshoot orders include both apostolic and contemplative Sisters of “Our Lady of Charity of the Good Shepherd”, which have now been joined back together as one order with Christian missionary work towards sex workers. 

There was a pilgrimage chapel of Our Lady of Charity near “Sainte Laurent sur La Plaine” which was destroyed by order of the French revolutionary government in 1791. Shortly afterward, a Marian apparition was reported to be seen on the ruined altar and in a nearby oak tree. This set off more pilgrimages and became part of the unrest leading up to the War in the Vendée. Today, a small one is on the altar in the newly restored church.

Italy

An image of Our Lady of Charity is venerated in Moschiano, Italy. On 14 June 1886, this particular image was bestowed a canonical coronation.

Mexico
Pope Paul VI granted a decree of pontifical coronation Quandoquidem Beatissima Virgo  for a namesake image in Huamantla, Mexico in 25 July 1974. The coronation took place on 15 August 1974. The same pontiff raised the Shrine to the status of Minor Basilica via his pontifical decree Tanta Est Dignitas on 5 August 1978.

Spain

An earlier image of Our Lady of Charity predating and sourcing the Cuban image is venerated in the town of Illescas, Toledo, Spain. Legend recalls that it was copied from a "Saint Luke" image from Antioch and brought by Saint Paul the Apostle to Toledo between the year 50 and 60 A.D.
From that date, the image remained when the Archbishop of Toledo Eugenius II of Toledo, who placed the image in a Benedictine monastery.
In the 16th century, the image was transferred to a local Hospital of Charity where a famed miraculous healing of paralyzed patient Francesca de la Cruz took place in 1562. During the same time, the image was revised, separating the heads and hands of the Virgin from its fully formed or detallado style, in order to allow vestments and jewels to fit the image.

The venerated Pieta image of Our Lady of Charity in the city of Cartagena, was canonically crowned on 17 April 1923 by Pope Pius XI.

Pope Paul VI granted a pontifical decree of coronation for a namesake image in Sanlúcar de Barrameda, Andalusia on 28 March 1965. The coronation took place on 15 August of the same year. Pope John Paul II later issued a pontifical decree Qua veneratione which raised her shrine to the status of Minor Basilica on 19 February 1997.

Philippines

In the Philippines, Our Lady of Charity is known by its Spanish predecessor, the original Our Lady of Lacara (1494), later known in Ilocano as Apo Caridad (English: Mistress of Charity). The Marian title is a replica of the older Marian image that has been long venerated in Toledo, Spain.
 Pope Pius XII issued a pontifical decree of coronation titled “Quas Tuas” on 3 August 1955 and was granted to the Archbishop of Nueva Segovia, Santiago Caragnan y Sancho. The decree was signed by the Secretary Deacon Giulio Rossi and notarized by the Grand Chancellor, Girolamo Ricci. The image was crowned on 12 January 1956 by the Apostolic Nuncio, Cardinal Egidio Vagnozzi and named as “Patroness of Ilocandia”.  The image of Our Lady of Charity, is enshrined at the Bantay Church in Bantay, Ilocos Sur.
 Another image of Our Lady of Charity is also enshrined  within the Minor Basilica of Our Lady of Charity in Agoo, La Union. The image was episcopally crowned on 1 May 1971 under the Papal nuncio Carmine Rocco. Pope John Paul II raised her shrine to the status of Minor Basilica via his Pontifical decree Signum illud on 15 July 1982.

United States of America
On 8 September 1961, the Archdiocese of Miami celebrated the feast of Our Lady of Charity with 30,000 Cuban exiles at Miami Stadium where a 16-inch replica of the statue of Our Lady of Charity was smuggled out of Cuba.  Due to the overwhelming Cuban devotion to this Marian title in 1966, the Archdiocese of Miami announced the construction of the Shrine of Our Lady of Charity. Construction was begun on the shrine, known as La Ermita de la Caridad, the following year on the shores of Biscayne Bay in the Coconut Grove section of Miami. The shrine was completed in 1973, built with donations by new Cuban exiles.

Churches

Cuba
 El Cobre (Pontifical shrine)

France
 La Charité-sur-Loire (Priory)

Mexico
 Huamantla, Tlaxcala (Pontifical shrine)

Spain
 Cartagena (Pontifical shrine)
 Villarrobledo 
 Illescas (Pontifical shrine)
 Loja and The Garrovilla
 Cam arena

The Philippines
 Quezon City, Metro Manila
 Agoo, La Union (Minor Basilica)
 Bantay, Ilocos Sur (Pontifical shrine)

United States of America
 Miami, Florida
 Cicero, Illinois 
 Buffalo, New York

References

External links

 Virgin of Charity, El Cobre
 Pope Francis Sends Message to Cuba on Patroness’ Feast Day 
 Our Lady of Charity - Official Web Site - Cuban Catholic Church
 La Ermita de la Caridad

Christianity in Cuba
Statues of the Madonna and Child
Catholic pilgrimage sites
Shrines to the Virgin Mary
Our Lady of Charity